The Deputy Chief Minister of Gujarat is a position of the Cabinet in the Government of Gujarat. There is not currently a Deputy Chief Minister of Gujarat.

Deputy Chief Minister of Gujarat
The list of deputy chief ministers in the Indian state of Gujarat include:

Keys:

References 

Deputy chief ministers of Gujarat
Gujarat
Deputy Chief